Kerki District   (formerly Atamyrat District) (1999–2017) is a district of Lebap Province in Turkmenistan. The administrative center of the district is the town of Kerki. It is found in 1925.

References

Districts of Turkmenistan
Lebap Region